Jonathan Dunn-Rankin (November 30, 1930 – December 12, 2014) was an American actor, television journalist and gay activist.

Early life
Jonathan Dunn-Rankin was born on November 30, 1930, in New Jersey. He graduated from Rollins College after serving in the US Army in France, and he earned a master's degree from the Columbia University Graduate School of Journalism in 1958.

Career
Dunn-Rankin first interned at CBS News in New York City. He later worked as a television journalist in Florida, Cleveland, Ohio and Phoenix, Arizona. From 1965 to 1977, he worked for KFMB-TV, a television station based in San Diego. Dunn-Rankin also became a stage actor at the Old Globe Theatre in San Diego.

Dunn-Rankin was "a founder of the San Diego Democratic Club, a leader of the Gay Academic Union and an early supporter of Lambda Archives". He was also the chairman of the Diversionary Theatre, an LGBT theater in San Diego.

Personal life and death
Dunn-Rankin had a partner, David Ramos, and resided in San Diego. He died on December 12, 2014.

References

External links
Jonathan Dunn-Rankin on IMDb

1930 births
2014 deaths
Male actors from New Jersey
Rollins College alumni
Columbia University Graduate School of Journalism alumni
American television journalists
Television anchors from San Diego
Male actors from San Diego
American LGBT rights activists
American gay actors
United States Army soldiers
LGBT people from New Jersey